The Tree of Gernika is a personal account of the Basque campaign of the Spanish Civil War by London Times correspondent G. L. Steer. The book is known for its description of the 1937 bombing of Guernica. The author was previously known for his reportage on the Second Italo-Ethiopian War. The book includes photographs and maps. Its photographs were especially powerful in spreading news of the event. Steer was one of four foreign journalists in the area and was partially responsible for spreading news of the attack contrary to Franco, who at first denied that the attack had occurred. The book's criticism of Franco Nationalism, particularly the 1937 bombing of Guernica, prevented its publication within Spain. The book's Basque translation was published by exiles in Caracas in 1963. Foreign Affairs called The Tree of Gernika a "reportorial masterpiece in its vividness, insight and authenticity" and recommended it for Franco adherents.

References

Bibliography

Further reading

External links 

 

1938 non-fiction books
Hodder & Stoughton books
Spanish Civil War books
English-language books
Bombing of Guernica